is a Japanese professional shogi player ranked 9-dan. He is a former Ōshō and Kiō title holder.

Early life
Kubo was born in Kakogawa, Hyōgo on August 27, 1975. He learned shogi when he was about four years old, and at the encouragement of a friend of his father soon began playing regularly at the Kobe Shogi Center in neighboring Kobe. The center was managed by shogi professional  who became Kubo's shogi teacher after the two played a 19-piece "Naked King" handicap game. In 1986, he advanced to the semi-finals of the 11th  as fifth-grade elementary school student, but lost to the eventual tournament winner and fellow future shogi professional Daisuke Suzuki. Later that same year, Kubo entered the Japan Shogi Association's apprentice school at the rank of 6-kyū under the guidance of Awaji. He was awarded professional status and the rank of 4-dan on April 1, 1993, at the age of 17.

Shogi professional
Kubo's first appearance in a major title match came in 2000 when he challenged Yoshiharu Habu for the 26th Kiō title. Kubo advanced to the title match by defeating Masataka Gōda 2 games to 0 to win the two-game challenger playoff, but was unable to defeat Habu, losing the match 3 game to 1. The following year, he also challenged Habu for the 49th Ōza title, but lost once again by the same score. In 2007, Kubo once again challenged Habu in the 55th Ōza title match, but was defeated 3 games to 0.

Kubo's first major title victory came in 2009 when he defeated Yasumitsu Satō 3 games to 2 to take the 34th Kiō title. Kubo successfully defended his title for the next two years by defeating Satō once again 3 games to 2 in 2010 and Akira Watanabe 3 games to 1 in 2011. Kubo, however, was unable to defend his title for the third consecutive year, losing the 37th title match to Gōda 3 games to 1.

In 2008, Kubo challenged Habu for the 57th Ōshō title, but lost the match 4 games to 1. The two met again in 2009 for the 59th Ōshō title, and this time Kubo was the winner by the score of 4 games to 2. The victory made Kubo a "2-crown" (a player who simultaneously holds two major titles) for the first time. Kubo successfully defended his title the following year by defeating Masayuki Toyoshima 4 games to 2, but lost the 61st Ōshō title match to Satō 4 games to 1 in 2012. Kubo won the title for the third time in 2017 when he defeated Gōda 4 games to 2 to win the 66th Ōshō title, and successfully defend his title in 2018 when defeated Toyoshima once again 4 games to 2 to win the 67th Ōshō title. Kubo, however, was unable to defend his title once again the following year when he lost the 68th Ōshō match to Watanabe 4 games to none.

In SeptemberOctober 2020, Kubo challenged Takuya Nagase for the 68th Ōza title, but lost the match 3 games to 2.

Playing style
Kubo along with fellow ranging rook specialists Takeshi Fujii and Daisuke Suzuki are collectively referred to as the "Ranging Rook Big Three".

Promotion history
Kubo's promotion history is as follows:
 6-kyū: 1986
 1-dan: 1989
 4-dan: April 1, 1993
 5-dan: April 1, 1995
 6-dan: November 25, 1998
 7-dan: April 1, 2001
 8-dan: April 1, 2003
 9-dan: March 30, 2010

Titles and other championships
Kubo has appeared in major title matches a total of fifteen times, and has won the Kiō title three times and Ōshō title four times. In addition to major titles, Kubo has won six other shogi championships during his career.

Major titles

Other championships

Note: Tournaments marked with an asterisk (*) are no longer held.

Awards and honors
Kubo has received a number awards and honors throughout his career for his accomplishments both on an off the shogi board. These include awards given out annually by the JSA for performance in official games as well as other awards for achievement.

Annual shogi awards
22nd Annual Awards (April 1994March 1995): Best Winning Percentage
26th Annual Awards (April 1998March 1999): Most Consecutive Games Won
28th Annual Awards (April 2000March 2001): Fighting-spirit Award
31st Annual Awards (April 2003March 2004): Distinguished Service 
36th Annual Awards (April 2008March 2009): Fighting-spirit Award, Most Games Played, Most Games Won, Kōzō Masuda Award
37th Annual Awards (April 2009March 2010): Excellent Player, Most Games Played, Game of the Year
38th Annual Awards (April 2010March 2011): Excellent Player
41st Annual Awards (April 2013March 2014): Special Game of the Year Award
44th Annual Awards (April 2016March 2017): Fighting-spirit Award

Other awards
2013: Shogi Honor Award (Awarded by the JSA in recognition of winning 600 official games as a professional)
2021:  Shogi Honor Fighting-spirit Award (Awarded by JSA in recognition of winning 800 official games as a professional)

Year-end prize money and game fee ranking
Kubo has finished in the "Top 10" of the JSA's  fourteen times and in the "Top 3" twice since turning professional.

Note: All amounts are given in Japanese yen and include prize money and fees earned from official tournaments and games held from January 1 to December 31.

Personal life
Kubo's eldest daughter Shōko is a women's professional shogi player.

References

External links
 ShogiHub: Professional Player Info · Kubo, Toshiaki
 Shogi Fan: Kubo won the Ousho title

1975 births
Japanese shogi players
Living people
Professional shogi players
Professional shogi players from Hyōgo Prefecture
Kiō
Ōshō
Recipients of the Kōzō Masuda Award
People from Kakogawa, Hyōgo
Ginga